Douglass is a city in Butler County, Kansas, United States.  As of the 2020 census, the population of the city was 1,555.

History

19th century
The first settlement was made at Douglass in 1869. Douglass is named for its founder, Joseph W. Douglass, a storeowner who was fatally shot at the town site in 1873 while apprehending a suspected chicken thief. Douglass was incorporated as a city of the third class in 1879.

In 1877, the Florence, El Dorado, and Walnut Valley Railroad Company built a branch line from Florence to El Dorado, in 1881 it was extended to Douglass, and later to Arkansas City.  The line was leased and operated by the Atchison, Topeka and Santa Fe Railway.  The line from Florence to El Dorado was abandoned in 1942.  The original branch line connected Florence, Burns, De Graff, El Dorado, Augusta, Douglass, Rock, Akron, Winfield, Arkansas City.

21st century
In 2010, the Keystone-Cushing Pipeline (Phase II) was constructed about 1.8 miles west of Douglass, north to south through Butler County.

Geography
Douglass is located at  (37.516802, -97.011705).

Climate
The climate in this area is characterized by hot, humid summers and generally mild to cool winters.  According to the Köppen Climate Classification system, Douglass has a humid subtropical climate, abbreviated "Cfa" on climate maps.

Demographics

2010 census
As of the census of 2010, there were 1,700 people, 625 households, and 452 families living in the city. The racial makeup of the city was 96.6% white, 0.4% African American, 1.1% Native American, 0.5% Asian, and 1.5% from two or more races. Hispanic or Latino of any race were 2.2% of the population.

There were 625 households, of which 40.0% had children under the age of 18 living with them, 52.8% were married couples living together, 13.1% had a female householder with no husband present, 6.4% had a male householder with no wife present, and 27.7% were non-families. 24.5% of all households were made up of individuals, and 11.3% had someone living alone who was 65 years of age or older. The average household size was 2.68 and the average family size was 3.18.

The median age in the city was 33.6 years. 29.9% of residents were under the age of 18; 8.7% were between the ages of 18 and 24; 25.8% were from 25 to 44; 23.1% were from 45 to 64; and 12.3% were 65 years of age or older. The gender makeup of the city was 48.8% male and 51.2% female.

2000 census
As of the census of 2000, there were 1,813 people, 658 households, and 492 families living in the city. The racial makeup of the city was 96.25% white, 0.28% African American, 1.60% Native American, 0.22% Asian, 0.50% from other races, and 1.16% from two or more races. Hispanic or Latino of any race were 1.65% of the population.

There were 658 households, out of which 40.0% had children under the age of 18 living with them, 58.2% were married couples living together, 11.9% had a female householder with no husband present, and 25.1% were non-families. 21.1% of all households were made up of individuals, and 9.3% had someone living alone who was 65 years of age or older. The average household size was 2.67 and the average family size was 3.13.

In the city, the population was spread out, with 30.5% under the age of 18, 9.3% from 18 to 24, 29.1% from 25 to 44, 16.4% from 45 to 64, and 14.7% who were 65 years of age or older. The median age was 33 years. For every 100 females, there were 91.0 males. For every 100 females age 18 and over, there were 90.9 males.

The median income for a household in the city was $40,833, and the median income for a family was $49,875. Males had a median income of $37,000 versus $25,938 for females. The per capita income for the city was $17,965. About 4.5% of families and 6.1% of the population were below the poverty line, including 6.7% of those under age 18 and 7.0% of those age 65 or over.

Education

The community is served by Douglass USD 396 public school district.

Notable people
 Monty Beisel (b1978), football linebacker in NFL.
 William Couch (1850–1890), leader of the Oklahoma Boomer Movement and as the first provisional mayor of what became Oklahoma City. 
 James Durham (1881–1949), pitcher in Major League Baseball.
 Phyllis Haver (1899–1960), actress during silent film era.
 George Hill (1895–1934), film director and cinematographer during silent film era.

See also
 National Register of Historic Places listings in Butler County, Kansas
 Douglass Township Community Building
 Extreme Makeover: Home Edition (season 3)

References

Further reading

External links

 City of Douglass
 Douglass - Directory of Public Officials
 Douglass city map, KDOT

Cities in Kansas
Cities in Butler County, Kansas
Wichita, KS Metropolitan Statistical Area
Populated places established in 1869
1869 establishments in Kansas